The Verdugos is a region of Los Angeles County, California including the areas in and around the Verdugo Mountains.

Geography
According to the Mapping L.A. survey of the Los Angeles Times, the Verdugos region consists of:

Altadena
Glendale
La Crescenta-Montrose
La Cañada Flintridge
Pasadena
Sunland
Tujunga

Population

In the 2000 census, the Verdugos region had a population of 453,399.

References

See also
Other regions of Los Angeles County

 Angeles National Forest
 Antelope Valley
 Central Los Angeles
 Eastside
 Harbor
 Northeast Los Angeles
 Northwest County
 Pomona Valley
 San Fernando Valley
 San Gabriel Valley
 South Bay
 Santa Monica Mountains
 South Los Angeles
 Southeast County
 Verdugos
 Westside

Geography of Los Angeles